Wulfgar was a medieval Bishop of Ramsbury.

Wulfgar was consecrated in 981. He died between 985 and 986.

Citations

References

External links
 

Bishops of Ramsbury (ancient)
980s deaths
Year of birth unknown
Year of death uncertain
10th-century English bishops